Creek Road station (formerly Oakview) is a SEPTA Route 102 trolley stop in Drexel Hill, Pennsylvania. It is located at the end of Station Road north of Creek Road (although SEPTA gives the address as being at Darby Creek Road at Railroad) within Indian Rock Park, a  Natural Environmental Park in Drexel Hill, containing picnic tables, playground equipment, basketball courts, and Darby Creek.

Trolleys arriving at this station travel between 69th Street Terminal in Upper Darby, Pennsylvania and Sharon Hill, Pennsylvania. Oakview might have little significance were it not for the fact that the stop is near the bridge over Darby Creek and Creek Road. Besides the aforementioned features within Indian Rock Park, the street leads to a historic Swedish Log Cabin built sometime around 1654, which is believed to be the oldest log house in North America.

Station layout

References

External links

Darby Creek Trestle near Creek Road Station (World-NYC Subway.org)
Friends of the Swedish Cabin
2009 YouTube Video of "Oakview Station"

SEPTA Media–Sharon Hill Line stations